Alexander Gauge (29 July 1914 – 29 August 1960) was a British actor best known for playing Friar Tuck in The Adventures of Robin Hood from 1955 to 1959.

Born in a Methodist Mission station in Wenzhou in China, Gauge was a well-known English character actor. Gauge attended school in California before moving to England. He served in the British Army in India during World War II, where he became acquainted with John Masters. He first appeared on the New York stage in 1945. He acted in many of Shakespeare's plays, and usually played villains in British films, but many considered his forte to be comedy. He was a great hit in the London stage production of The Seven Year Itch.

Gauge appeared in the films The Interrupted Journey in 1949, and, all in 1952, Murder in the Cathedral, Mother Riley Meets the Vampire, with Old Mother Riley and Béla Lugosi, and was the flirtatious Tracy Tupman in The Pickwick Papers. He also appeared in the films Martin Luther (1953), Beau Brummell (1954), The Green Man (1956) and The Iron Petticoat (1956) starring Bob Hope. In 1955 he joined the cast of both The Scarlet Pimpernel (as George, the Prince Regent) and The Adventures of Robin Hood, as Friar Tuck, a role he played until 1960. In 1959 Gauge starred as Brigadier Wellington-Bull in the series The Adventures of Brigadier Wellington-Bull alongside Valerie Singleton.

In 1960, just weeks before his death, he played the Duke of Norfolk in the original West End production of A Man for All Seasons at the Globe Theatre. His last performance was a posthumous appearance in the 1961 film Nothing Barred starring Brian Rix.

Gauge  married Phyllis Anne Young in Penzance in 1957. He died aged 46 in Woking in Surrey in 1960 from an overdose.

Partial filmography

 The Interrupted Journey (1949) as Jerves Wilding (film debut)
 Flesh and Blood (1951) as Coutts
 Murder in the Cathedral (1951) as King Henry II
 Mother Riley Meets the Vampire (1952) as Police Constable (uncredited)
 Penny Princess (1952) as MacNabb the Lawyer (uncredited)
 The Pickwick Papers (1952) as Tracy Tupman
 The Great Game (1953 film) as Ben Woodhall
 Martin Luther (1953) as Tetzel
 The Square Ring (1953) as 2nd Wiseacre
 House of Blackmail (1953) as Markham
 Counterspy (1953) as Smith
 Will Any Gentleman...? (1953) as Mr. Billing
 The Blazing Caravan (1954, Short) as Mr. Buxton
 Fast and Loose (1954) as Hankin
 Double Exposure (1954) as Denis Clayton
 Dance, Little Lady (1954) as Joseph Miller
 The Golden Link (1954) as Arnold Debenham
 Beau Brummell (1954) as Newspaper Man (uncredited)
 Sherlock Holmes (1954, TV) as Jabez Wilson
 Tiger by the Tail (1954) as Fitzgerald
 Mystery on Bird Island (1954) as Bronson
 Before I Wake (1955) as Police Sergeant
 The Hornet's Nest (1955) as Mr. Arnold
 Reluctant Bride (1955) as Humbold
 No Smoking (1955) as Wellington-Simpson
 Handcuffs, London (1955) as Nicholas Bardwill
 The Adventures of the Scarlet Pimpernel (1955-1956) as The Prince Regent
 The Adventures of Robin Hood (1955-1959, TV) as Friar Tuck
 Port of Escape (1956) as Inspector Levins
 The Iron Petticoat (1956) as Senator Howley
 Breakaway (1956) as MacAllister
 The Green Man (1956) as Chairman
 The Passionate Stranger (1957) as Master of Ceremonies at Dance
 The Third Man (1959, TV) as Coffier
 Les canailles (1960) as Chalmers
 Nothing Barred (1961) as Traffic Policeman (final film)

References

External links

Gauge and The Adventures of Robin Hood
Gauge on the New York Times website

1914 births
1960 deaths
English male film actors
English male television actors
British Army personnel of World War II
20th-century English male actors
Deaths from brain cancer in England